Made to Stick: Why Some Ideas Survive and Others Die is a book by brothers Chip and Dan Heath published by Random House on January 2, 2007. The book continues the idea of "stickiness" popularized by Malcolm Gladwell in The Tipping Point, seeking to explain what makes an idea or concept memorable or interesting. A similar style to Gladwell's is used, with a number of stories and case studies followed by principles.

The stories range from urban legends, such as the "Kidney Heist" in the introduction; to business stories, as with the story of Southwest Airlines, "the low price airline"; to inspirational, personal stories such as that of Floyd Lee, a passionate mess hall manager. Each chapter includes a section entitled "Clinic", in which the principles of the chapter are applied to a specific case study or idea to demonstrate the principle's application.

Overview
The book's outline follows the acronym "SUCCES" (with the last s omitted). Each letter refers to a characteristic that can help make an idea "sticky":
 Simple – find the core of any idea or thoughts
 Unexpected – grab people's attention by surprising them
 Concrete – make sure an idea can be grasped and remembered later
 Credible – give an idea believability and credibility
 Emotional – help people see the importance of an idea
 Stories – empower people to use an idea through narrative

Authors
Chip Heath is a professor of organizational behavior at Graduate School of Business at Stanford University. Dan Heath, a former researcher at Harvard, is a consultant and developer of innovative textbooks.  They also write a regular feature for Fast Company magazine.

Reception
The book was commercially successful, appearing on the New York Times and Wall Street Journal bestseller lists, alongside a 24-month listing on BusinessWeek book listings.

Writing in The Guardian, William Leith described it as a "smart, lively book" that is "fun to read" and will give readers "an insight into the power of bad ideas" as well as better ones. In her review in the Stanford Social Innovation Review, Judith Samuelson observed that "The Heath brothers have taught me that if anyone is going to 'get' my idea – need it, buy it, fund it, use it – I need to radically shorten my elevator pitch. Writing in BookPages, Eliza McGraw wrote, "How do we make people care about our ideas?, the Heaths ask. We appeal to their self-interest, but we also appeal to their identities not only to the people they are right now but also to the people they would like to be."

See also
Meme
Viral marketing
The Tipping Point, by Malcolm Gladwell, which popularized the concept of "stickiness".
Think!: Why Crucial Decisions Can't Be Made in the Blink of an Eye

References

External links
Official website

2007 non-fiction books
Business books
Random House books